The  was a class of minelayers of the Imperial Japanese Navy (IJN), serving during and after the 1930s through World War II. Their design was based on the Tsubame-class, but with increased armament.

Ships in class

Natsushima-class
Project number H5. 3 vessels were planned under the Maru 1 Programme, however, 3rd ship Sarushima was used to diesel engine experiment ship.

24 December 1931: Laid down at Tōkyō Ishikawajima Zōsen.
 24 March 1933: Launched.
 31 July 1933: Completed.
 In 1934: Rebuilding after the Tomozuru Incident.
 In 1938: Sortie for the Second Sino-Japanese War.
 1941-1943: Sortie for the naval mine laying at Japan Mainland.
 10 December 1943: Dispatched to southeast area.
 22 February 1944: Sunk by USS Stanly, USS Charles Ausburne and USS Dyson off Kavieng .
 30 April 1944: Removed from naval ship list.

19 January 1933: Laid down at Harima Zōsen.
 26 March 1934: Launched.
 20 September 1934: Completed.
 In 1938: Sortie for the Second Sino-Japanese War.
 1941-1943: Sortie for the naval mine laying at Japan Mainland and convoy escort operations at East China Sea.
 31 December 1943: Dispatched to southeast area.
 1 April 1944: Sunk by air raid at Rabaul.
 10 April 1944: Removed from naval ship list.

Sarushima-class
Project number H5B. She was built as diesel engine experiment ship. Her results were made use of in the Sokuten-class.

28 March 1933: Laid down at Mitsubishi, Yokohama shipyard.
 16 December 1933: Launched.
 20 July 1934: Completed.
 In 1938: Sortie for the Second Sino-Japanese War.
 1941-1944: Sortie for the naval mine laying and convoy escort operations at Japan Mainland.
 4 July 1944: Sunk by air raid off Otōto-jima.
 10 September 1944: Removed from naval ship list.

Photos

Bibliography
Ships of the World special issue Vol.45, "Escort Vessels of the Imperial Japanese Navy", (Tokyo, Japan), 1996.
The Maru Special, Japanese Naval Vessels No.47, "Japanese naval mine warfare crafts",  (Tokyo, Japan), 1981.